Point Davenport Conservation Park is a protected area occupying Point Davenpoint, a headland between Foul Bay and Sturt Bay on the south coast of Yorke Peninsula in South Australia about  south of Warooka.  The park was proclaimed in 1987.  The conservation park is considered to be ‘an area of high biodiversity with a range of habitats including beaches and foredunes, and an estuary that is listed as a nationally important wetland.’  It is classified as an IUCN Category III protected area.

References

External links
Point Davenport Conservation Park webpage on protected planet

Conservation parks of South Australia
Protected areas established in 1987
Yorke Peninsula